Hok Yuen (Chinese: 鶴園) or formerly Hok Un is a place in at the southeastern coast of Kowloon Peninsula, Hong Kong. It is at the north of Hung Hom, south of Quarry Hill and east of Lo Lung Hang.

History
At the time of the 1911 census, the population of Tin Wan was 1,272. The number of males was 789.

Collapse of building at 45 Ma Tau Wai Road (2010)

On 29 January 2010, Block J of 45 Ma Tau Wai Road, a rundown five-storey residential building in Hok Yuen, collapsed with little warning, resulting in the deaths of four people. The event took place at around 1:30pm. Renovation work was being carried out on the commercial unit located on the ground floor of the building, when construction workers noticed signs of an imminent collapse and rushed out to raise the alarm. It is speculated that the unauthorised renovation was the primary factor that led to the collapse of an already decaying and structurally weak building. Some of the residents were alerted by the commotion and evacuated seconds before the entire building caved in. A squad of fireman arrived at the scene just as the disaster unfolded, having received an emergency call from a passer-by prior to the collapse. Several hundred emergency workers were deployed in the ensuing rescue operation, which had to take place under adjacent buildings that were themselves subject to collapse at any moment. Temporary reinforcements were erected to support and stabilise the remaining structures to give added protection to the rescue teams.

The Chief Executive Donald Tsang later visited the site to inspect the rubble.

A repair order had been issued by the authorities months before, but at the time of the inspection, the extent of the symptoms did not indicate the gravity of the situation. The walk-up building, which was 55 years old, was the last block in a group of ten identical buildings. Each floor housed four apartments of around 150 square feet (14 square metres), which in some cases were further partitioned by their owners. Residents in the adjoining blocks were subsequently relocated to temporary shelters in the immediate aftermath and then on to interim housing at public estates. This type of building is typical of many over the territory.

Implications and further action
The case was the first of its type in several decades, and raised new awareness amongst the public of the potential dangers faced by residents of such buildings. A thorough investigation into this particular incident, as well as a plan to prevent similar cases from occurring was ordered by the Government. The approximately four thousand buildings of the same classification that were constructed before 1960 were subsequently earmarked for inspection within one month.

The Urban Renewal Authority later announced development of the other blocks in the row.

References

Hung Hom
Places in Hong Kong